Karimabad (also Romanized as Karīmābād) is a village in Howmeh Rural District, in the Central District of Behbahan County, Khuzestan Province, Iran. At the 2006 census, its population was 591, in 121 families.

References 

Populated places in Behbahan County